Lake Bile (means 'white lake') is a lake in the south-western Ukraine, in the delta of the Dniester River. It is located south from the village of Mayaki. The lake is 1.7 km long and 0.8 km width. It is connected with the Dniester River and its left branch Turunchuk.

Similar to the other lakes of the Dniester River delta, Lake Bile is the unique biotope, inhabited by a lot of rare plant species and a nesting place of a lot of birds. The white water lily (Nymphaea alba), water caltrop (Trapa natans), brandy-bottle (Nuphar lutea), and mint (Mentha sp.) grow in the lake.

References

Sources 

 http://www.poezdnik.kiev.ua/ozera/bile_odessa/

Landforms of Odesa Oblast
Bile
Geography of Odesa Raion